The Ed Defore Sports Complex is located in Macon, Georgia, next to Westside High School.

Formerly the "Bibb County Sports Complex", the name was changed in 2008 to honor Macon City Council member Ed Defore, who has served on the council since 1971.

The complex has a football stadium, soccer field, and two baseball diamonds.

References

External links
 Ed Defore Sports Complex

Sports venues in Georgia (U.S. state)
Buildings and structures in Macon, Georgia
Sports in Macon, Georgia
Soccer venues in Georgia (U.S. state)
American football venues in Georgia (U.S. state)
Baseball venues in Georgia (U.S. state)
Sports complexes in the United States